The A66 autoroute is a  long motorway in the south of France, also called L'Ariégeoise.

It is in the departments of the Haute-Garonne and Ariège, and connects Villefranche-de-Lauragais with a junction to the A61 at its north and ends at the  N20 at Pamiers to the south. It is operated by the company ASF, and it was finished in early 2002.  It forms part of a larger European route:

Paris - Orléans - Limoges - Toulouse - Barcelona.

The road provides access to the Midi-Pyrénées towards the Principality of Andorra, and the junctions between Ariégeois and Toulouse.

Junctions

Exchange A61-A66 Junction with A61 autoroute to Toulouse.
01 (Nailloux) Towns served: Nailloux, Montgiscard, Venerque 
02 (Mazères) Towns served: Mazères, Saverdun) 
03 (Pamiers-Nord) Towns served: Pamiers
04 (ZA de Peak) Towns served: Pamiers

The following exchangers are now on the RN20, but a number is still allotted to them:
 
05 (Pamiers-Center) Towns served: Pamiers, La Bastide-de-Lordat, Belpech) 
06 (Pamiers-Sud) Towns served: Pamiers, La Tour-du-Crieu, Mirepoix, Saint-Jean-du-Falga, Carcassonne) 
07 (Verniolle) Towns served: Verniolle 
08 (Varilhes) Towns served: Varilhes, Dalou 
09 (Saint-Jean-du-Falga) Towns served: Saint-Jean-du-Falga, Crampagna, Centre hospitalier de Foix-Pamiers)
10 (Foix-Center) Towns served: Foix, Loubières, Vernajoul, Underground river of Labouiche, Saint-Bosoms, Tarbes) 
11 To be constructed
12 (Saint-Paul-de-Jarrat) Town served: Saint-Paul-of-Jarrat, Lavelanet, Perpignan) 
13 (Montoulieu) Towns served: Montoulieu 
14 (Arignac) Towns served: Arignac, Mercus-Garrabet

Future
The N20 dual carriageway between Pamiers, Foix and Tarascon-sur-Ariège is to be upgraded to motorway standard, and renumbered the A66, however no date for this has been announced.

External links

 A66 Motorway in Saratlas

Autoroutes in France